The WWE Hardcore Championship was a professional wrestling championship contested for in the United States–based World Wrestling Entertainment (WWE) promotion, formerly known as the World Wrestling Federation (WWF) before May 2002. The title was only contestable in matches under hardcore regulations, and could be won only by individual wrestlers. As a professional wrestling championship, it was introduced by the WWF on its television program Raw Is War on November 2, 1998, in which WWF chairman Mr. McMahon awarded Mankind the title. In 2000, the WWF instated the "24/7 rule", a regulation stating that the title could be defended anywhere at any time as long as a referee was present, which led to numerous title changes in shorter time periods; the rule was discontinued in 2002. On the August 26, 2002 episode of Raw, Intercontinental Champion Rob Van Dam defeated Hardcore Champion Tommy Dreamer to unify both titles; the Hardcore Championship was retired shortly thereafter. The title was reactivated on two occasions afterwards, although they are not considered official reigns by WWE according to their official title history. On the June 23, 2003 episode of Raw, Mick Foley (who was the first champion as "Mankind") was awarded the Hardcore Championship belt by the Raw brand authority figure Stone Cold Steve Austin for his contributions in hardcore wrestling. Edge and Foley then introduced themselves as co-holders of the championship in 2006, due to a storyline with alumni of the hardcore wrestling-based Extreme Championship Wrestling (ECW) promotion.

Overall, there were 240 reigns shared among 52 wrestlers. Raven has the most reigns as champion, with 27. Big Boss Man's fourth reign was the longest in the title's history, at 97 days. Steve Blackman ranks first in combined reigns by length, at 172 days in six reigns. Due to the "24/7 rule" numerous wrestlers held the title less than one day, and because the exact times at which each wrestler held the title is unknown, it is impossible to determine who had the shortest reign. Each reign was won at WWF/E-promoted events: pay-per-view events, house shows, and on televised events.

Reigns

Names

Reigns

Combined reigns

Footnotes

See also 
 WCW Hardcore Championship: a hardcore championship that was contested for in World Championship Wrestling (WCW)
 List of former championships in WWE

References 
 General
 
 
 Note: Used only to determine which programs title changes occurred on and when they aired
 Specific

External links 
 WWE.com

WWE championships lists
Hardcore wrestling championships

de:WWE Hardcore Championship#Liste der Titelträger (chronologisch)